The women's javelin throw at the 2012 IPC Athletics European Championships was held at Stadskanaal Stadium from 24–28 July.

Medalists
Results given by IPC Athletics.

Results

F12/13 + F37/38

F52/53/33/34

F46

F54/55/56

F57/58

See also
List of IPC world records in athletics

References

javelin throw
2012 in women's athletics
Javelin throw at the World Para Athletics European Championships